Mlomp is a village in Lower Casamance, Senegal, located to the north of Thionck Essyl and to the south of . At the time of the 2002 census, the locality contained  in 382 households. It is the main settlement of the rural community of Mlomp (Bignona), in Bignona Department of the Ziguinchor Region.

History
List of chiefs of Mlomp:
 Landiany Sambou (1882-1903)
 Abdou Niamby Sambou (1903-1929)
 Idrissa Horro Sambou (1929-1945)
 Lalo Diatta (1945-1952)
 Mamadou Sambou (1952-1995)
 Idrissa Sambou (1995-2011)
 Mamadou diatta (2011–present)

Administration 
Village chief : Mamadou diatta (elected 29 October 2011)

Heads of the quarters : Lamine Coly (Boundia), who died 31 May 2015 at Ziguinchor;
Sahissa Mané Sambou (Etamaya);
Yaya Sambou (Balokir);
Abba Diédhiou (Kawaguir)

Mlomp consists of four quarters which contain 11 sub-quarters.
 Boundia Quarter. Sub-quarters : Boussoya, Djifalone, Manana.
 Balokir Quarter. Sub-quarters : Balokir, Dialome, Kagogoune.
 Etamaya Quarter. Sub-quarters : Koubananck, Kagnédième, Boffé, Bakobote
 Kawaguir Quarter. Sub-quarters : Bondine, Dialome.

People from Mlomp
Youba Sambou, Senegalese Minister of Armed Forces (2000-2002)

References

External links 
 Plan local d'hydraulique et d'assainissement (PLHA) : Communauté rurale de Mlomp (Bignona) (PEPAM, July 2010)
 Association Un, File on the village of Mlomp  PDF (1999)

Populated places in the Bignona Department